Bozzini may refer to:

People
 Luigia Bozzini (19th century), Italian painter, daughter of Paolo Bozzini
 Paolo Bozzini (1815–1892), Italian painter, father of Luigia Bozzini
 Philipp Bozzini (1773–1809), German physician

Other
 Quatuor Bozzini, Canadian string quartet